Not Just a Fad is the second studio album by the American female rap group J.J. Fad. It was released in 1990 via Ruthless Records. The album spawned three singles: "We in the House", "Gold", and "Be Good ta Me". Neither the album nor the singles registered on any major music chart. Although the group never officially broke up, they have not released an album since Not Just a Fad.

Production
The album was primarily produced by DJ Yella. Dr. Dre was originally going to produce the album, but he wanted to push back the sessions; J.J. Fad decided not to wait on him.

Critical reception
The Los Angeles Times wrote: "This heretofore lightweight West Coast trio has always been pitted against Salt-N-Pepa, the New York-based rap unit whose style is far tougher and grittier. This time around, J.J. Fad's idea of fighting fire with fire is to come on like Luke Campbell's dream dates—though they do close the album by chastely thanking 'the man up above.'"

Track listing

Sample credits
Track 2 contains elements from "Pump That Bass" by Original Concept (1986), "Dance to the Drummer's Beat" by Herman Kelly & Life (1978), "Looking for the Perfect Beat" by Afrika Bambaataa & Soulsonic Force (1983)
Track 3 contains elements from "Get Me Back on Time, Engine #9" by Wilson Pickett (1970)
Track 4 contains elements from "Hot Pants (Bonus Beats)" by Bobby Byrd (1987), "Funky Drummer" by James Brown (1970), "I Wouldn't Change a Thing" by Coke Escovedo (1976), "I Know You Got Soul" by Bobby Byrd (1971), "Funky President (People It's Bad)" by James Brown (1974)
Track 8 contains elements from "Think (About It)" by Lyn Collins (1972)
Track 10 contains elements from "Get Up Offa That Thing" by James Brown (1976), "Troglodyte (Cave Man)" by The Jimmy Castor Bunch (1972), "Christmas Rappin'" by Kurtis Blow (1979), "Funky Drummer" by James Brown (1970), "Ashley's Roachclip" by The Soul Searchers (1974), "Kool Is Back" by Funk, Inc. (1971), "N.T." by Kool & the Gang (1971), "Terminator X Speaks With His Hands" by Public Enemy (1987)
Track 11 contains elements from "Ashley's Roachclip" by The Soul Searchers (1974), "Troglodyte (Cave Man)" by The Jimmy Castor Bunch (1972), "Funky Drummer" by James Brown (1970), "Christmas Rappin'" by Kurtis Blow (1979), "N.T." by Kool & the Gang (1971), "Terminator X Speaks With His Hands" by Public Enemy (1987)
Track 15 contains elements from "The Champ" by The Mohawks (1968), "Funky Drummer" by James Brown (1970)

Personnel

Dania Maria Birks – lead vocals, backing vocals
Juana Michelle Burns – lead vocals, backing vocals
Antoine Carraby – producer
Peter Dokus – photography
Michelle Franklin – lead vocals, backing vocals
Brian Knapp Gardner – mastering
Jerry Heller – management
Stan Kocontes – backing vocals (track 14)
Clarence Lars – scratches
Kim Renard Nazel – producer (tracks: 1, 2, 4–9, 11–14)
Michael Sims – guitar, bass guitar
Donovan Smith – engineer
Eric Wright – executive producer

References

External links 

1990 albums
J. J. Fad albums
Ruthless Records albums